The 2016 draft for the Canadian Women's Hockey League took place on August 21, 2016. Players must register before midnight on August 1, 2016 and pay an entry fee of CDN $150.

By virtue of finishing with the worst record during the 2015-16 CWHL regular season, the Boston Blades selected first overall. Of note, it signified the first time that the Blades ever held the first pick overall in the history of the CWHL Draft.

Following the Blades with the second pick overall shall be the Toronto Furies. The Furies cross-town rivals, the Brampton Thunder have the third pick overall. Despite having finished with the best regular season record, Les Canadiennes de Montreal shall select fourth overall while the defending Clarkson Cup champion Calgary Inferno shall select fifth overall. 

With the first pick overall, the Boston Blades selected Canadian-born Kayla Tutino, most recently of the Boston University Terriers women's ice hockey program. As a side note, the Blades also held the last pick overall in the draft, taking forward Jennifer Currie of UMass Boston in the sixteenth round. 

Forward Claudia Tellez of the Mexico women's national ice hockey team became the first Mexican-born player selected in the history of the CWHL Draft. Other international players selected in the draft include France's Marion Allemoz and Japan's Nachi Fujimoto, both selected by the Canadiennes de Montreal. Sato Kikuchi from Japan's Nippon Sports Science University would be claimed by Boston in the eighth round. 

Of note, a pair of players who competed with the Buffalo Beauts during the 2015-16 NWHL season were selected in the CWHL Draft. With their seventh round pick, the Toronto Furies selected Erin Zach while goaltender Amanda Makela was selected by the Canadiennes in the eighth round.

Notable entries in the draft 
Notable entries in the draft include
Renata Fast
Erin Ambrose
Emerance Maschmeyer

Top 25 picks

Picks by team

Boston

Brampton

Calgary

Montreal

Toronto

References

See also 
2010 CWHL Draft
2011 CWHL Draft
2012 CWHL Draft
2013 CWHL Draft
2014 CWHL Draft
2015 CWHL Draft

Canadian Women's Hockey League